Alwyn Young is a professor of economics and the Leili & Johannes Huth Fellow at the London School of Economics and Political Science (LSE). He held a named chair at the University of Chicago and was on the faculty at Boston University and the MIT Sloan School of Management before joining the LSE faculty. A graduate of Cornell University, he holds an MA in law and diplomacy and a PhD in international relations, both from the Fletcher School of Law and Diplomacy at Tufts University, and a PhD in economics from Columbia University. Young has taught courses in introductory economics at the LSE to first-year undergraduates, and topics in modern economic growth as a part of advanced macroeconomics course at postgraduate level.

Well known academic papers by Alwyn Young include The tyranny of numbers: confronting the statistical realities of the East Asian growth experience and A tale of two cities: factor accumulation and technical change in Hong Kong and Singapore.

Professor Young's most recent research has focussed on growth in the African continent as well as the impact of HIV-Aids on GDP figures

Selected publications
"The Gift of the Dying: The Tragedy of AIDS and the Welfare of Future African Generations". Quarterly Journal of Economics 120 (May 2005): 243–266.  PDF.  Appendix.
"Gold into Base Metals: Productivity Growth in the People’s Republic of China during the Reform Period". Journal of Political Economy 111 (December 2003): 1220–1261.
"The Razor’s Edge: Distortions and Incremental Reform in the People’s Republic of China". Quarterly Journal of Economics 115 (November 2000): 1091–1135.  Data.
“Growth without Scale Effects". Journal of Political Economy 106 (February 1998): 41–63.  JSTOR.
"The Tyranny of Numbers: Confronting the Statistical Realities of the East Asian Growth Experience". Quarterly Journal of Economics 110 (August 1995): 641–680.  JSTOR.
"Lessons from the East Asian NICs:  A Contrarian View.” European Economic Review 38 (1994): 964–973.
"Substitution and Complementarity in Endogenous Innovation.” Quarterly Journal of Economics 108 (August 1993): 775–807.  JSTOR.
"Invention and Bounded Learning by Doing". Journal of Political Economy 101 (June 1993): 443–472.  JSTOR.
"A Tale of Two Cities:  Factor Accumulation and Technical Change in Hong Kong and Singapore".  In NBER, Macroeconomics Annual 1992.  Cambridge, MA: MIT Press, 1992.  PDF.
"Learning by Doing and the Dynamic Effects of International Trade". Quarterly Journal of Economics 106 (May 1991):  369–405.  JSTOR.

See also
 Exogenous growth model

References

Year of birth missing (living people)
Living people
Economics educators
University of Chicago faculty
Cornell University alumni
The Fletcher School at Tufts University alumni
Columbia Graduate School of Arts and Sciences alumni
MIT Sloan School of Management faculty
Academics of the London School of Economics